Tatul Avoyan (born August 20, 1964), known commonly by his mononym Tatul or Tatoul, is an Armenian rabiz singer.

Biography
Tatul Avoyan was born in Yerevan on August 20, 1964.

Avoyan graduated from the Romanos Melikian Musical College. He is known particularly for his widespread hits "Papik Em Dartsel" (Պապիկ եմ դարձել) performed with Spitakci Hayko (Hayk Ghevondyan) and "Im Axperes" (Իմ ախպերս). Avoyan's father Frounz Avoyan was one of the pioneering artists in the rabiz genre, while his brothers Ashot, Samvel, and Serob are also musicians.

In 2012, he moved to the United States from Armenia.

He has had several collaborations with other Armenian singers and DJs, such as Super Sako and DJ Davo.

Discography 
Darnatsel E Ays Ashkhare (1992)
Chem Uzum (1995)
Yerazner (1996)
Siro Yeraz (1997)
Tatoul & Hovo (1997)
Best of Tatoul (1998)
Asdvadz Im (1998)
Keghdz Ashkhar (1999)
Gaghtni Mna (2000)
Tatoul & Hovo "2000" (2001)
Tatoul & Hovo "Noritz Menk" (2003)
Aysor Yev Mishd (2003)
Tatoul & Stars (2004)
Tatoul, Anna, Armen, Koji "Live: Vol. 1" (2004)
Tatoul, Anna, Armen, Koji "Live: Vol. 2" (2004)
Live Concert in Erevan (2004)
Tatoul & Vle "Yes U Du" (2007)
Tatoul & Hayko "Live" (2007)
Live Concert in Greece (2008)
Nostalgie: Live Concert (2008)
One & Only (2010)
Gold Collection (2012)
The Legacy Continues [2 CD Set] (Unreleased Album)

Singles 
Jutak (feat. Afon Masumyan) (1999)
Anitsum Em Ays Ashkhare (feat. Grisha Aghakhanyan) (2000)
Yekav Anush Garune (2002)
Tsnoghi Srbutyun (feat. Hovik Avetisyan) (2009)
Pandukht (feat. Seno) (2009)
Yerazners (feat. Arsen Hayrapetyan) (2009)
Havatam (feat. Super Sako) (2010)
Varderi Taguhi Es (feat. Bojak) (2011)
Amen Or Em Spasum (2012)
Mi Kich Zhamanak (Live) (2012)
Let's Go Back... (feat. Super Sako) (2012)
Dimanam Dimanam (feat. Saqo Haroutyunyan) (2013)
Imanam Imanam (feat. Lusine Grigoryan) (2013)
Heranam (feat. DJ Davo) (2013)
Im Balik (feat. Spitakci Hayko) (2015)
Shnorhavor (feat. DJ Davo) (2015)
Na Na Na (feat. Super Sako) (2016)
Kamar Kamar (feat. DJ Davo) (2016)
Jana Jana (feat. Spitakci Hayko & DJ Davo) (2016)
Yeraz E Na (feat. DJ Davo) (2016)
Zangum Em (feat. DJ Davo) (2017)
Heranal (feat. DJ Davo) (2017)
Che Chem Karogh (feat. DJ Davo) (2017)
Aman Aman (feat. DJ Davo & Eric Shane) (2017)
Molor Molor (feat. Lusine Grigoryan) (2018)
Imnes (feat. DJ Davo) (2018)
Gaghtni Mna (feat. Ara Alik Avetisyanner) (2020)
Du Es Du (DJ Hye FX Remix) (2021)

References 

1953 births
Living people
20th-century Armenian male singers
Armenian Yazidis
21st-century Armenian male singers